The Argo-Rowley Terrace Marine Park (formerly known as the Argo-Rowley Terrace Commonwealth Marine Reserve) is an Australian marine park offshore of Western Australia. It is the largest of the 13 parks managed under the North-west Marine Parks Network.

Conservation values

Species and habitat
Important foraging areas for migratory seabirds and the endangered loggerhead turtle.
Important area for sharks, which are found in abundance around the Rowley Shoals relative to other areas in the region.

Bioregions and ecology
The reserve provides protection for many seafloor features including aprons and fans, canyons, continental rise, knolls/abyssal hills and the terrace and continental slope.
Examples of the communities and seafloor habitats of the Northwest Transition and Timor Province provincial bioregions.
The reserve provides connectivity between the existing Mermaid Reef Marine Park and reefs of the Western Australian Rowley Shoals Marine Park and the deeper waters of the region.
Canyons linking the Argo Abyssal Plain with the Scott Plateau (unique seafloor feature with enhanced productivity and feeding aggregations of species).
Mermaid Reef and the Commonwealth waters surrounding Rowley Shoals (an area of high biodiversity with enhanced productivity and feeding and breeding aggregations).

History
The marine park was proclaimed under the EPBC Act on 14 December 2013 and renamed Argo-Rowley Terrace Marine Park on 9 October 2017. The management plan and protection measures of the marine park came into effect for the first time on 1 July 2018.

Summary of protection zones
The Argo-Rowley Terrace Marine Park has been assigned IUCN protected area category VI. However, within the marine park there are three protection zones; each zone has an IUCN category and related rules for managing activities to ensure the protection of marine habitats and species.

The following table summarizes the zoning rules within the Argo-Rowley Terrace Marine Park:

See also

 Protected areas managed by the Australian government

References

External links

 North-west Marine Parks Network - Parks Australia
 North-west Marine Parks Network - environment.gov.au (outdated)

Australian marine parks